Moondru Pillaigal is a 1952 Indian Tamil-language drama film produced by S. S. Vasan. Based on Victor Fleming's 1927 American film The Way of All Flesh, it is about a couple and their three sons. The film was directed by Nagendra Rao and stars himself alongside Kannamba, with M. K. Radha, Gemini Ganesan and Sriram in supporting roles. It was simultaneously produced and released in Telugu under the title Mugguru Kodukulu. The film failed at the box office, which led to Vasan destroying all copies of it, thus making it a lost film.

Plot 

Gunavathi and Somasekhar, a couple, have three sons. The youngest one takes responsibility for a theft allegedly committed by their his and goes to jail. The dejected Somasekhar commits suicide and Gunavathi is abandoned by the other two sons. Later, when the youngest son is released from jail, he takes care of his mother despite being jobless. However, he receives an offer from a film company to act as the main character in a film produced by them based on the Ramayana. He succeeds in his job and manages to unite the family.

Cast 
Cast from the song book

 Kannamba as Gunavathi
 Nagendra Rao as Somasekhar
 M. K. Radha as Muthu (Adult)
 Sriram as Kannan (Adult)
 Ganesh as Sekhar (Adult)
 Kumari Vanaja as Kamala (Adult)
 Sundari Bai as Pankajam
 Suryaprabha as Kamini
 G. Pattu Iyer as Ramadas
 Narayana Rao as Film Proprietor
 Chandra Babu as Music Director
 Vikatam Krishnamurthi as Film Dealer
 S. Krishnamoorthy as Film Production Assistant

 Seetharaman as Film Production Assistant
 Sethumadhavan as Muthu (Child)
 Sudhakar as Kannan (Child)
 Sudhindra as Sekhar (Child)
 Seetha as Kamala's Friend
 K. Ramaswamy as Pedagogue
 Venkat as Bar-at-Law
 Ramakrishna Rao as Marwari
 G. V. Sharma as Amina
 V. T. Kalyanam as Race Broker
 Saraswathi as Susheela (Adult)
 Rathna Papa as Muthu's Girl

 Mohan as Muthu's Boy
 Premakumari as Kamala (Child)
 Vijaya Rao as Doctor
 Balan as Sub Inspector
 Velayutham as Old Metal Merchant
 P. M. Devan as Office Proprietor
 Bindu Madhavan as Film Director
 Rama Narasu as Production Manager
 B. S. P. Rao as Naughty Student
 T. S. B. Rao as Jatka Man
 Sampath Kumar as Suresh
 Muthukrishna Reddy as Milkman

Production 
The film was based on the 1927 American silent film The Way of All Flesh, directed by Victor Fleming. The family drama was successful in India, and was adapted into a film in Hindi titled Khazanchi (1941). The Hindi film was highly successful in Madras and ran for more than 25 weeks. Nagendra Rao, an established producer and director in Kannada cinema, was impressed by the film and decided to direct the Tamil adaptation. He approached the Tamil film producer S. S. Vasan of Gemini Studios who had earlier produced Apoorva Sagodharargal, in which Rao played a role. Although Vasan was initially reluctant he agreed to finance the film. It was simultaneously produced and released in Telugu under the title Mugguru Kodukulu. According to writer Ashokamitran, who was then associated with Gemini, novelist R. K. Narayan wrote a treatment for this film.

J. P. Chandrababu, who would later go on to become an established comedian in Tamil cinema, played a small role lasting a single sequence in the film. Savitri, who would later become an established actress in the Telugu and Tamil film industries, was to make her acting debut with this film. Ganesh (later known as Gemini Ganesan), who played a supporting role as one among the three sons in the film was also as a casting assistant with Gemini, the production company. He recommended her for a small role in the film; however, she was not selected for the role.

Table of Moondru Pillaigal and Mugguru Kodukulu Casts

Reception 
Moondru Pillaigal failed at the box-office, which led to Vasan destroying all copies of it, thus making it a lost film. Ashokamitran said there was nothing "seriously wrong" with the film, but felt that "the audience just couldn't take another film about a family torn asunder in the fourth reel and reunited in the last."

Soundtrack 
Music was composed by P. S. Anantharaman and supervised by M. D. Parthasarathy while the lyrics were penned by Kothamangalam Subbu and V. Seetharaman. The song "Antha Rama Sowndharyam" is set in the Carnatic raga known as Kedaragaula.

See also 
 List of Tamil films of 1952

References

Bibliography

External links 

1950s lost films
1950s multilingual films
1950s Tamil-language films
Gemini Studios films
Indian drama films
Indian family films
Indian multilingual films
Indian remakes of American films
Lost drama films
Lost Indian films